Morris Glacier may refer to:
 Morris Glacier (Ross Dependency)
 Morris Glacier (South Georgia)